Deishuan Booker (born December 29, 1996) is an American basketball player who plays guard for Hapoel Galil Elyon in the Israeli Basketball Premier League. He played college basketball for Gillette College, the  College of Southern Idaho, and California State University, Long Beach. In 2018-19 he led the NCAA with 250 free throws, while he was third in the NCAA with a .912 free throw percentage.

Early life
Booker was born in Las Vegas, Nevada.

He played high school basketball for Andre Agassi College Preparatory Academy ('15) in Las Vegas for two seasons. Booker averaged 27.7 points per game at as a senior, leading the state in scoring. He was named the Southern League Player of the Year both seasons, and a third-team all-state selection.

College career
In 2015-16 Booker played basketball for Gillette College. He averaged 11.0 points, 4.3 assists, and 3.4 rebounds per game.

In 2016-17 he played basketball for the College of Southern Idaho. Booker averaged 9.8 points, 6.4 assists, 4.4 rebounds, and 1.7 steals per game.

In 2017-19 Booker played basketball for California State University, Long Beach ('19). In 2017-18 he averaged 10.6 points per game, 4.6 assists per game (leading the Big West Conference), 1.5 steals per game (4th), and 94 turnovers (leading the Big West), with an .858 free throw percentage (2nd) and a .557 2-point field goal percentage (5th). In 2018-19 he averaged 18.8 points per game (3rd in the Big West), 4.4 assists per game (3rd), 1.3 steals per game (8th), and 130 turnovers (leading the Big West), with a .912 free throw percentage (leading the Big West, and 3rd in the NCAA), and his 250 free throws led the NCAA. In 2018 he was All-Big West Honorable Mention, and in 2019 he was Big West First Team, and Big West All-Tournament Team. His career .897 free throw percentage is tops in the Big West, and 10th in the NCAA.

Professional career
In 2019-20 Booker played for CEZ Nymburk in the Czech National Basketball League.

In 2020-21 he played for BG Göttingen in the EasyCredit BBL. That season Booker also played for Anwil Wloclawek in the Polish Basketball League, for whom he averaged 15.3 points per game and 5.4 assists per game.

In 2021-22 he played for Le Mans Sarthe Basket in the Jeep Elite. That season Booker also played for Fos-sur-mer in the Jeep Elite.

In 2022-23 Booker is playing at guard for Hapoel Galil Elyon in the Israeli Basketball Premier League.

References

External links
Twitter page
Instagram page

1996 births
Living people
American men's basketball players
African-American basketball players
American expatriate basketball people in the Czech Republic
American expatriate basketball people in France
American expatriate basketball people in Germany
American expatriate basketball people in Israel
Guards (basketball)
Hapoel Galil Elyon players
Israeli Basketball Premier League players
Basketball players from Nevada
Long Beach State Beach men's basketball players
Sportspeople from Las Vegas
21st-century African-American sportspeople